Zoltán Jovánczai (born 8 December 1984 in Kaposvár) is a Hungarian football player who currently plays for Kaposvári Rákóczi FC.

External links
http://www.UEFA.com
http://www.ftc.hu

1984 births
Living people
People from Kaposvár
Hungarian footballers
Association football forwards
Kaposvári Rákóczi FC players
Ferencvárosi TC footballers
Vasas SC players
Lombard-Pápa TFC footballers
Sportspeople from Somogy County